Mesites may refer to:
 the plural of mesite (Mesitornithidae); a family of birds of uncertain affinities. 
 Mesites (beetle), a beetle genus in the tribe Cossonini
 Mesites, a disused synonym for a genus of sea cucumbers, Mesothuria